Dogma in the broad sense is any belief held unquestioningly and with undefended certainty. It may be in the form of an official system of principles or doctrines of a religion, such as Roman Catholicism, Judaism, or Protestantism, as well as the positions of a philosopher or of a philosophical school such as Stoicism. 
It may also be found in political belief systems, such as communism, progressivism, liberalism, and conservatism.

In the pejorative sense, dogma refers to enforced decisions, such as those of aggressive political interests or authorities. More generally, it is applied to some strong belief which its adherents are not willing to discuss rationally. This attitude is named as a dogmatic one, or as dogmatism, and is often used to refer to matters related to religion, but is not limited to theistic attitudes alone and is often used with respect to political or philosophical dogmas.

Etymology

In philosophy

Pyrrhonism 

In Pyrrhonism, "dogma" refers to assent to a proposition about a non-evident matter. The main principle of Pyrrhonism is expressed by the word acatalepsia, which connotes the ability to withhold assent from doctrines regarding the truth of things in their own nature; against every statement its contradiction may be advanced with equal justification. Consequently, Pyrrhonists withhold assent with regard to non-evident propositions, i.e., dogmas.  Pyrrhonists argue that dogmatists, such as the Stoics, Epicureans, and Peripatetics, have failed to demonstrate that their doctrines regarding non-evident matters are true.

In religion

Christianity 
In Christianity, a dogma is a belief communicated by divine revelation and defined by the Church, The organization's formal religious positions may be taught to new members or simply communicated to those who choose to become members. It is rare for agreement with an organization's formal positions to be a requirement for attendance, though membership may be required for some church activities. 

In the narrower sense of the church's official interpretation of divine revelation, theologians distinguish between defined and non-defined dogmas, the former being those set out by authoritative bodies such as the Roman Curia for the Catholic Church, the latter being those which are universally held but have not been officially defined, the nature of Christ as universal redeemer being an example. The term originated in late Greek philosophy legal usage, in which it meant a decree or command, and came to be used in the same sense in early Christian theology. Protestants to differing degrees are less formal about doctrine, and often rely on denomination-specific beliefs, but seldom refer to these beliefs as dogmata. The first unofficial institution of dogma in the Christian church was by Saint Irenaeus in his Demonstration of Apostolic Teaching, which provides a 'manual of essentials' constituting the 'body of truth'.

Catholicism and Eastern Christianity 

For Catholicism and Eastern Christianity, the dogmata are contained in the Nicene Creed and the canon laws of two, three, seven, or twenty ecumenical councils (depending on whether one is Church of the East, Oriental Orthodox, Eastern Orthodox, or Roman Catholic). These tenets are summarized by John of Damascus in his Exact Exposition of the Orthodox Faith, which is the third book of his main work, titled The Fount of Knowledge. In this book he takes a dual approach in explaining each article of the faith: one, directed at Christians, where he uses quotes from the Bible and, occasionally, from works of other Church Fathers, and the second, directed both at members of non-Christian religions and at atheists, for whom he employs Aristotelian logic and dialectics.

The decisions of fourteen later councils that Catholics hold as dogmatic and a small number of decrees promulgated by popes exercising papal infallibility (for examples, see Immaculate Conception and Assumption of Mary) are considered as being a part of the Catholic Church's sacred body of doctrine.

Judaism 
In the Jewish commentary tradition, dogma is a principle by which the Rabbanim can try the proofs of faith about the existence of God and truth;  dogma is what is necessarily true for rational thinking. In Jewish Kabbalah, a dogma is an archetypeof the Pardes or Torah Nistar, the secrets of Bible. In the relation between "logical thinking" and "rational Kabbalah" the "Partzuf" is the means to identify "dogma".

Similar concepts

Buddhism

View or position (Pali , Sanskrit ) is a central idea in Buddhism that corresponds with the Western notion of dogma. In Buddhist thought, a view is not a simple, abstract collection of propositions, but a charged interpretation of experience which intensely shapes and affects thought, sensation, and action. Having the proper mental attitude toward views is therefore considered an integral part of the Buddhist path, as sometimes correct views need to be put into practice and incorrect views abandoned, while at other times all views are seen as obstacles to enlightenment.

See also

References

Bibliography

External links

 Dogma – Strong's N.T. Greek Lexicon
 Il Domani – terribile o radioso? – del Dogma , a book by Enrico Maria Radaelli with a Preface by Roger Scruton and comments by Brunero Gherardini, Alessandro Gnocchi-Mario Palmaro, and Mario Oliveri (Roma 2012)
 Irenaeus. Demonstration of the Apostolic Preaching. pp. 70–75. [online] available at: Christian Classics ethereal library St. Irenaeus: Demonstration of the Apostolic Preaching – Christian Classics Ethereal Library [Accessed 20 June 2017]

 
Dogmatism
Christian terminology
Epicureanism
Epistemology of religion
Greek words and phrases
Justification (epistemology)
Principles
Pyrrhonism
Religious belief and doctrine
Stoicism
Concepts in ancient Greek epistemology